KHF Prishtina  is a women's handball club from Prishtina, Kosovo. KHF Prishtina competes in the SuperLiga e femrave e Kosoves and the Kosovo Handball Women's Cup.

Titles 

 Kosovar Handball Superliga
 Winner (9) : 1973, 1983, 1987, 1997, 2010, 2011, 2012, 2016, 2017

 Kosovar Handball Cup
 Winner (9) : 1995, 1997, 2004, 2008, 2009, 2011, 2012, 2016, 2017

European record

Team

Current squad 

Squad for the 2016–17 season

Goalkeepers
 Njomeza Kelmendi
 Agnesa Krasniqi 

Wingers
RW
  Rolanda Shala
  Elmedina Zeqiri
LW 
  Era Alickaj
  Qendresa Berisha
  Florentina Prelvukaj
Line players 
  Emine Hoti
  Dafina Rama
  Luljeta Sopjani

Back players
LB
  Isma Muqolli
  Burneta Rama
CB 
  Pranvera Ferataj
  Mimoza Sefedini 
RB
  Blede Krasniqi
  Lena Mekolli
  Iva Stojkovska

External links

 
 EHF Club profile

Kosovar handball clubs
Sport in Pristina